Dary Dasuda is a former Nigerien bantamweight boxer. He competed at the 1968 Summer Olympics, losing in his only match to Sulley Shittu of Ghana.

References

External links
 

Year of birth missing (living people)
Living people
Nigerien male boxers
Olympic boxers of Niger
Boxers at the 1968 Summer Olympics
Bantamweight boxers
Place of birth missing (living people)